Eliseo Reyes Rodríguez (1940–1967) was a Cuban guerrillero. He joined the Cuban Revolution on the side of the insurgents as a messenger and later platoon leader for the Fourth Column of the rebel army, where he established a friendship with Ernesto Guevara. In 1966 he joined the Cuban expedition to form the Ñancahuazú Guerrilla in Bolivia, led by Guevara. There, Eliseo served as a captain and political comissar. His commander, Guevara, described Eliseo as the best man of the guerrilla. Eliseo died while leading an ambush party on the 25th of April 1967.

20th-century Cuban military personnel
1940 births
1967 deaths